This is the discography of TobyMac. He was originally a member of dc Talk from 1988 to 2001. Since 2001 he has released eight studio albums, two Christmas albums, five remix albums, three live albums, and three extended plays as a solo artist.

Albums

Studio albums

Christmas albums

Remix albums

Live albums

EPs

Singles

As a lead artist

2000s

2010s

2020s

As a featured artist

Other charted songs

Other appearances

Compilation appearances
 Solo by dc Talk, 2001 "Extreme Days" (from Momentum), "Somebody's Watching" (from Momentum) [ForeFront]
 Extreme Days Movie Soundtrack, 2001 "Extreme Days" (from Momentum) [ForeFront]
 WOW Hits 2002, 2001 "Somebody's Watching" (from Momentum) [Sparrow]
 WOW Christmas: Red, 2002 "This Christmas" (from This Christmas) [Sparrow]
 2:52 – Smarter, Stronger, Deeper, Cooler, 2002 "Get This Party Started" (from Momentum) [Forefront]
 WOW Hits 2003, 2002 "Irene" (from Momentum) [Sparrow]
 Simply Groovy New Music Sampler, 2002 "Irene," "Yours" (from Momentum) [Forefront]
 Festival Con Dios Volume Two, 2002 "Extreme Days" (from Momentum) [InPop]
 Sonic Fuel, 2002 "Yours" (from Momentum) [EMI]
 ConGRADulations!: Class of 2002, 2002 "Extreme Days" (from Momentum) [interl'inc]
 Spynpsycle-Living with the Machines, 2003 "Yours" (from Momentum) [Sparrow]
 Next Step, 2003 "Get This Party Started" (from Momentum) [Forefront]
 WOW Hits 2004, 2003 "Phenomenon" (from Welcome to Diverse City) [Sparrow]
 It Takes Two, 2003 "Part of Me" (w/ Sandtown) [Sparrow]
 Smash-ups, 2003 tobyMac "Yours" vs. Relient K "Pressing On" [Sparrow]
 The Ringleader. Mixtape III by DJ Maj, 2003 "J Train (Awlboard Remix)" [Gotee]
 Dove Hits 2003, 2003 "Irene" (from Momentum) [Reunion]
 X 2003, 2003 "Get This Party Started" (from Momentum) [Forefront]
 Mixdown, 2003 "Somebody's Watching" (Remix) [Forefront]
 WOW Hits 2005, 2004 "Gone" (from Welcome to Diverse City) [EMI CMG]
 Hip Hope 2005, 2004 ...."Extreme Days (Shoc Remix)," (from Re:Mix Momentum) ("Ohh, Ahh" by GRITS featuring tobyMac) [Gotee]
 Beatmart Recordings: Best of the Submissions, 2004 "Yes Yes Y'all" w/ Todd Collins [Beatmart]
 X 2004, 2004 "One Phenom (Remix)" (from Phenomenon Single) [BEC]
 In the Name of Love: Artists United for Africa, 2004 "Mysterious Ways" [Sparrow]
 ConGRADulations!: Class of 2004, 2004 "Phenomenon" (from Welcome to Diverse City) [interl'inc]
 WOW Christmas: Green, 2005 "O Come All Ye Faithful" (from This Christmas) [Word]
 WOW Hits 2006, 2005 "Atmosphere (Remix) (featuring dc Talk)" (from Welcome to Diverse City) [Sparrow]
 Music Inspired by The Chronicles of Narnia: The Lion, the Witch and the Wardrobe, 2005 "New World" [Disney/EMI CMG]
 The Second Chance: Original Motion Picture Soundtrack, 2005 "J Train (featuring Kirk Franklin)" (from Momentum) [Reunion]
 ConGRADulations Class of 2005, 2005 "Hey Now (Class of 2005 Remix)" [interl'inc]
 X 2005, 2005 "Gone" (from Welcome to Diverse City) [BEC]
 WOW Hits 2007, 2006 "Burn For You (Shortwave Radio Remix)" (from Renovating Diverse City) [EMI]
 X 2006, 2006 "The Slam" (from Welcome to Diverse City) [BEC]
 WOW Hits 2008, 2007 "Made to Love" (from Portable Sounds) [EMI]
 Shades of Christmas: Rock, 2007 "O Come All Ye Faithful" (from This Christmas) [Sparrow]
 Shades of Christmas: Pop, 2007 "This Christmas (Joy to the World)" (from This Christmas) [Sparrow]
 Veggietales – The Pirates Who Don't Do Anything: The Original Movie Soundtrack, 2007 "What We Gonna Do?" [Universal Christian]
 X 2008, 2007 "Boomin'" (from Portable Sounds) [BEC]
 Hip Hope 2008, 2007 "Boomin'" (from Portable Sounds) [Gotee]
 WOW Hits 2009, 2008 "Lose My Soul (featuring Kirk Franklin & Mandisa)" (from Portable Sounds) [EMI]
 WOW Hits 1, 2008 "I'm for You" (from Portable Sounds) [Provident]
 ConGRADulations Class of 2008, 2008 "I'm for You" (from Portable Sounds) [Interlinc]
 Workout & Worship, 2009 "One World" (featuring Siti Monroe) (from Portable Sounds) [Starsong]
 WOW Hits 2010, 2009 "City on Our Knees" (from Tonight) [EMI]
 ConGRADulations! Class of 2009, 2009 "I'm for You" (from Portable Sounds) [Interlinc]
 CompassionArt: Creating Freedom From Poverty, 2009 "Shout Praise" (w/Israel Houghton, Darlene Zschech), "Let It Glow" (w/Kirk Franklin) [Sparrow]
 Hip Hope Hits 2009, 2009 "One World (Liquid Remix)" (featuring Siti Monroe & KJ-52) [Gotee]
 Freedom: Artists United For International Justice Mission, 2010 "Hold On (Acoustic)" [FCS]
 WOW Hits 2011, 2010 "Get Back Up" (from Tonight) [EMI CMG]
 WOW Best of 2004, 2010 "Phenomenon" (from Welcome to Diverse City) [EMI CMG]
 Guitar Praise HITS Volume One, 2010 "I'm For You" (from Portable Sounds) [Starsong]
 WOW Christmas, 2011 "Christmas This Year (featuring Leigh Nash)" (from Christmas in Diverse City) [Word]
 WOW Hits 2012, 2011 "Tonight" (from Tonight) [EMI CMG/Word/Provident]
 Big Church Day Out EP, 2011 "Showstopper" (from Tonight) [EMI CMG]
 Top of Our Lungs, 2011 "I'm for You" (from Portable Sounds) [StarSong]
 Turn on the Lights, 2011 "Ignition" (from Portable Sounds) [StarSong]
 WOW #1s, 2011 "City on Our Knees" (from Tonight) [Word]
 X2012, 2012 "Tonight (featuring John Cooper of Skillet)" (from Tonight) [BEC]
 Seasons of Hope, 2012 "Burn for You (Shortwave Radio Mix)" (from Renovating Diverse City) [Starsong]
 WOW Hits 2013, 2012 "Me Without You" (from Eye on It) [EMI CMG/Word/Provident]
 WOW Hits 2014, 2013 "Steal My Show" (from Eye on It) [EMI CMG/Word/Provident]
 WOW Hits 2015, 2014 "Speak Life" (from "Eye on It") [EMI CMG/Word/Provident]
 WOW Hits 2016, 2015 "Beyond Me" (from "This Is Not a Test") [EMI CMG/Word/Provident]
 WOW Hits 2017, 2016 "Feel It (featuring Mr. TalkBox) [Radio Edit] (from "This Is Not a Test") [EMI CMG/Word/Provident]
 WOW Hits 2018, 2017 "Love Broke Thru" (from "This Is Not a Test") [EMI CMG/Word/Provident]
 WOW Hits 2019, 2018 "I Just Need U." (from "The Elements") [EMI CMG/Word/Provident]
 The Least of These: Music From and Inspired By the Original Film, 2019 "Love of My Life" (later released on "The Lost Demos" in 2020) [Skypass Entertainment, Inc./The Fuel Music]

Album appearances

Videography

Video releases

Music videos

As lead artist

As featured artist

Cameo appearances

Notes

References

Discographies of American artists
Hip hop discographies
tobyMac